Harrison is an unincorporated community in Winnebago County, Illinois, and is located northwest of Rockford. It is part of the Rockford, Illinois Metropolitan Statistical Area.

References 

Rockford metropolitan area, Illinois
Unincorporated communities in Illinois
Unincorporated communities in Winnebago County, Illinois